Ruslan Oleksiyovych Stefanchuk (born 29 October 1975) is a Ukrainian politician, lawyer and Chairman of the Verkhovna Rada (since October 2021).

Stefanchuk was touted as the ideologue of Volodymyr Zelenskiy’s election campaign in the 2019 Ukrainian presidential election. He was elected to the Ukrainian parliament as a member of the Servant of the People party (placed 2nd on the party list) in the 2019 Ukrainian parliamentary election.

On the morning of the 2022 Russian invasion of Ukraine, Stefanchuk was rushed to the Mariinskyi Palace, amid reports of assassination attempts on Volodymyr Zelenskyy, as his role meant he would have to take command of the country had the president been killed.

Biography 
He also studied at the Khmelnytskyi National University. Doctor of Law, Professor.

First Deputy Chief Editor of the Law Magazine "Law of Ukraine".

He was Assistant of Member of Verkhovna Rada Anatoliy Matviyenko (2007–2012).

Honored Worker of Science and Technology of Ukraine (2017).

Stefanchuk is one of the authors of Ukrainian President Volodymyr Zelensky's 2019 election program. Zelensky won the election, in the second round of the election he defeated incumbent president Petro Poroshenko with nearly 73% of the vote to Poroshenko's 25%.

Stefanchuk was the Representative of the President of Ukraine Zelensky at the Verkhovna Rada (Ukraine's national parliament) from 21 May 2019 until 7 October 2021.

In the 2019 Ukrainian parliamentary election Stefanchuk was elected into parliament (placed 2nd on the party list) Servant of the People party. His brother Mykola Stefanchuk was (in the same election) elected for the same party in the single-mandate constituency 187 (located in Khmelnytskyi Oblast). In total Servant of the People won 124 seats on the nationwide party list and 130 constituency seats.

On 29 August 2019 Stefanchuk was elected First Deputy Chair of the Verkhovna Rada.

On 7 October 2021, the Verkhovna Rada voted to dismiss Dmytro Razumkov from his post as Chairman of the parliament. The following day Stefanchuk was elected Chairman of the parliament with 261 members backing the appointment.

On 15 October 2021 Stefanchuk was appointed as member of the National Security and Defense Council of Ukraine by President Zelensky.

See also 
 List of members of the parliament of Ukraine, 2019–24

Notes

References

External links 

 

1975 births
Living people
Politicians from Ternopil
21st-century Ukrainian lawyers
Servant of the People (political party) politicians
Ninth convocation members of the Verkhovna Rada
Deputy chairmen of the Verkhovna Rada
Chairmen of the Verkhovna Rada
21st-century Ukrainian politicians
Laureates of the Prize of the Cabinet of Ministers of Ukraine for special achievements of youth in the development of Ukraine